Taozhuang is a town of Jiashan County, Zhejiang Province, China. Located in the northwest of the county, Taozhuang is famous for Lake Fenhu and its steel market.

History

Name 
Taozhuang was known as Liuxi (柳溪). During the Shaoxing Era of the reign of the Emperor Gaozong of Song (1131 - 1162), an officer called Tao Wenwo (陶文斡) migrated here from Suzhou and built a manor house, so the name changed to Taozhuang.

Recent 
Fenyu was merged with Taozhuang in 1999.

Administration 
Taozhuang is divided into 1 community, 9 villages and 1 Farms.
 Ｔaozhuang (陶庄)
 Taozhong (陶中)
 Jinhu (金湖)
 Hubin (湖滨)
 Fenyu (汾玉)
 Fenhu (汾湖)
 Fennan (汾南)
 Lisheng (利生)
 Xiangsheng (翔胜)

Economy

Transport 
 The county road Ping-Li (Pinghu to Lili) Road is across the town from east to west.
 The Chang-Jia High Way (Changshu to Jiaxing) is being built.
 The River Taipu(太浦河) is in the north, through Lake Fenhu, which can reach the Great Canal and Huangpu River.

Township-level divisions of Zhejiang